see also Francisco López (17th-century painter)

Francisco López was a Spanish painter. He was a scholar of Gaspar Becerra, who painted in Madrid in the reign of Philip II (1556–1598).

References

16th-century Spanish painters
Spanish male painters
Spanish Renaissance painters
Year of death unknown
Year of birth unknown